Panhe (Acjachemen: "the place at the water") was one of the largest Acjachemen villages confirmed to be over 9,600 years old and a current sacred, ceremonial, cultural, and burial site for the Acjachemen people.

The Acjachemen people fished in San Mateo Creek's extensive freshwater marshes, and practiced a hunter-gatherer lifestyle. The village of Panhe is estimated to have had a population of 300 or so before the first Spanish explorers came to the area, and is still a sacred site for the Acjachemen people.

Panhe is the site of the first baptism in California, and in 1769 saw the first close contact between Spanish explorers, Catholic missionaries, and the Acjachemen people. The village had the greatest number of baptisms in the records of Mission San Juan Capistrano.

Panhe was nearly destroyed by a planned toll road construction that was meant to connect to Interstate 5, but this was stopped by a coalition of Acjachemen people, environmentalists, and surfer groups. 

There is a yearly festival held at the site by the Acjachemen people to honor their ancestors and to partake in their culture together. The United Coalition to Protect Panhe and The City Project advocate for the preservation of the site.

References

Former populated places in California
Former Native American populated places in California
Juaneño populated places
History of San Diego County, California
Acjachemen